Sibyl Harton (1898-1993) was a major Church of England writer during the twentieth century. She was a correspondent with Thomas Merton during the 1960s, and visited him at the Abbey of Our Lady of Gethsemani in Bardstown, Kentucky. She is generally associated with an Anglo-Catholic perspective in theological writing. Harton was a frequent contributor to The Living Church magazine in the United States and published book reviews in English theological periodicals. She was a popular retreat director in the Episcopal Church during the 1960s and 1970s, and a vocal opponent of the ordination of women to the priesthood.

She was the wife and widow of Frederic Harton (1889-1958), Dean of Wells, a theological author in his own right who made significant adaptation of French- and Italian-language spiritual writing into an Anglican reading context.

Bibliography 
In Pursuit of Perfection: A Way of Christian Life (1936)
Once upon a Bed-time: Being Fifty-two Delectable Stories from the Bible for the Want-to-be-read-tos (1937)
A Child's Faith: Fifty-two Lessons (1938)
Spiritual Direction: A Practical Essay (1944)
The Sufferings of Christ: A Diurnal of Prayer for Lent (1945)
The Way of the Cross Arranged for Private Devotion (1947)
In Company with Jesus (1948)
In Search of Quiet: The Development and Practice of Private Retreat (1955)
On Growing Old: A Book of Preparation for Old Age (1957)
Busy My Heart with Quietude (1961)
The Practice of Confession: Why, What, How (1961)
Stars Appearing: Lives of Sixty-eight Saints of the Anglican Calendar (1962)
To Make Intercession (1964)
Doors of Eternity (1965)
Windfall of Light: A Study of the Vocation of Mother Eva Mary, CT (1968)

References
The Philadelphia Inquirer, February 6, 1965
Sioux Falls Argus Leader, March 26, 1965
The Los Angeles Times, April 11, 1965
 Racine, Wisconsin Journal Times, August 15, 1965
The Tacoma News Tribune, March 11, 1967
The Cincinnati Enquirer, January 4, 1969
The Miami Herald, February 15, 1969, p. 30

External links
Merton's Correspondence with Harton, Sibyl The Thomas Merton Center at Bellarmine University (finding aid)

1898 births
1993 deaths
Anglo-Catholic theologians
English Anglo-Catholics
English Christian theologians
English religious writers
Women religious writers